Vladimir Javier Hernández Rivera (born 8 February 1989) is a Colombian footballer who plays for Junior de Barranquilla . Mainly a left winger, he can also play as a forward or an attacking midfielder.

Club career

Early career
Born in Arauca, Hernández was bought by Junior in 2000 at the age of 11, while playing for lowly amateurs Mundialito 90. He played for the youth setup before being assigned to the club's reserve team, Barranquilla, in 2007.

Atlético Junior
In 2008, after contributing with 25 appearances and four goals during the previous campaign, Hernández was called up by first team manager Julio Avelino Comesaña. He made his Categoría Primera A debut on 13 September of that year, in a 1–0 home win against Millonarios. He was handed his first start for the Tiburones eight days later, in a 1–0 home success over Envigado.

Hernández only scored his first professional goal on 21 June 2009, netting the equalizer in a 2–2 away draw against Deportivo Cali. He became a regular starter in the 2010 season, contributing with 22 matches and one goal as his side was crowned champions of the Apertura tournament. He scored five goals in the following year, also lifting the Clausura.

Hernández scored his first Copa Libertadores goal on 23 February 2012, netting his team's first in a 2–2 draw at Universidad Católica. He featured regularly, appearing in five matches in a group stage exit.

Hernández scored his first professional brace on 31 August 2015, in a 3–1 home win against Deportivo Cali. He netted ten league goals in the campaign, also being a winner of Copa Colombia.

Santos
On 13 October 2016, Santos' president Modesto Roma Júnior confirmed the signing of Hernández prior to the 2017 campaign. The rumoured fee was believed to be US$ 1 million.

After scoring a bicycle kick goal in a 5–1 friendly home routing of KAC Kénitra, Hernández made his official debut for the club on 9 March 2017 by replacing Vitor Bueno in a 1–1 Copa Libertadores away draw against Sporting Cristal. He first appeared as a starter on 12 March of the same year, providing two assists in a 4–1 away routing of São Bernardo FC.

Hernández made his Série A debut on 14 May 2017; after coming on for Vitor Bueno, he scored his side's second goal in a 3–2 away loss against Fluminense.

Atlético Nacional
On 19 January 2018, Hernández was announced at Atlético Nacional back in his homeland.

International career
Hernández was called up for the training session of the Colombia national football team, between 14 and 18 February 2016 in Bogotá. He was also named in Colombia's provisional squad for Copa América Centenario but was cut from the final squad.

Hernández made his full international debut on 25 January 2017, replacing Santos teammate Jonathan Copete in a 1–0 friendly loss against Brazil.

Career statistics

Club

International

Honours
Junior
Categoría Primera A: 2010 Apertura, 2011 Clausura
Copa Colombia: 2015

References

External links

1989 births
Living people
People from Arauca Department
Colombian footballers
Association football wingers
Association football forwards
Categoría Primera A players
Categoría Primera B players
Campeonato Brasileiro Série A players
Atlético Junior footballers
Atlético Nacional footballers
Santos FC players
Colombia international footballers
Colombian expatriate footballers
Colombian expatriate sportspeople in Brazil
Expatriate footballers in Brazil